Delwyn Karen Brownlee (born 10 January 1969) is a New Zealand former cricketer who played as an all-rounder. She appeared in one Test match for New Zealand in 1995. She played domestic cricket for Southern Districts, Canterbury and Central Districts.

References

External links

1969 births
Living people
Cricketers from Christchurch
New Zealand women cricketers
New Zealand women Test cricketers
Southern Districts women cricketers
Canterbury Magicians cricketers
Central Districts Hinds cricketers